Janusz Waluś (born 3 November 1953) is a Polish ski jumper. He competed in the normal hill and large hill events at the 1976 Winter Olympics.

References

1953 births
Living people
Polish male ski jumpers
Olympic ski jumpers of Poland
Ski jumpers at the 1976 Winter Olympics
Sportspeople from Wrocław